The third election to Tayside Regional Council was held on 6 May 1982 as part of the wider 1982 Scottish regional elections. The election saw the Conservatives strengthening their control of the region's 46-seat council.

Aggregate results

References

Tayside
1982
May 1982 events in the United Kingdom